Knud Frederik Vilhelm Hannibal Melbye (14 May 1824 – 6 October 1882) was a Danish marine artist.  Over the course of his career, he painted seascapes, coastal and harbor scenes, sailing vessels and topographical subjects in many parts of Europe, especially in the Mediterranean region.

Biography
Melbye was born in Elsinore, Denmark. He was the son of  Jacob Buntzen Melbye and Anna Marie (Clara) Christine Løehts. His brothers were painter and photographer Anton Melbye (1818–1875) and marine painter Fritz Melbye (1826–1869). He first trained to become a merchant but then turned to painting, studying under his older brother Anton, already an established marine painter, and attending the Royal Danish Academy of Fine Arts from 1844 to 1847. He also took private classes in perspective drawing with Carl Dahl.

In 1847, he went on his first journey, to Iceland aboard the corvette Valkyrien. In 1848, he became one of the first artists to paint in Skagen. The same year he traveled to Paris by way of Düsseldorf. In Paris he studied with Théodore Gudin (1802–1880) before returning to Denmark in 1849.

He was appointed professor at the academy in Copenhagen in 1880 but died in 1882 in Roskilde. He was interred at Holmens Kirkegård in Copenhagen.

Works
Vilhelm Melbye preferred a realistic style, often also with romantic or dramatic scenes. Many of his works depict southern European coastal or harbor views. He was influenced by his older brother and teacher Anton Melbye but another important influence in his oeuvre was the Düsseldorf School, especially Andreas Achenbach.

Gallery

See also
 Art of Denmark
 List of painters from Denmark

References

External links 

19th-century Danish painters
Danish male painters
Danish marine artists
People from Helsingør
1824 births
1882 deaths
Royal Danish Academy of Fine Arts alumni
Burials at Holmen Cemetery
19th-century Danish male artists